Virginie Bojaryn (born 3 August 1971) is a French breaststroke swimmer. She competed in two events at the 1988 Summer Olympics.

References

External links
 

1971 births
Living people
French female breaststroke swimmers
Olympic swimmers of France
Swimmers at the 1988 Summer Olympics
Swimmers at the 1987 Mediterranean Games
Swimmers at the 1991 Mediterranean Games
Mediterranean Games silver medalists for France
Mediterranean Games bronze medalists for France
People from Charleville-Mézières
Sportspeople from Ardennes (department)
Mediterranean Games medalists in swimming